Kelston Lock is a canal lock situated on the River Avon, between the villages of Kelston and Saltford, between Bristol and Bath, England.

The first cargo of 'Deal boards, Pig-Lead and Meal' arrived in Bath in December 1727. The navigation is now administered by the Canal & River Trust.

Above and below the lock and weir are permanent moorings. The Riverside Inn and Saltford Marina are also close by.

A branch of the river runs behind "Brass Mill Island", named for the annealing ovens of the former brass mill. The mill closed in the 1840s.

See also

Locks on the Kennet and Avon Canal

References

Locks on the Kennet and Avon Canal